Achnacloich is the name of three places in Scotland:
Achnacloich, Argyll and Bute, on the southern shore of Loch Etive
Achnacloich, Isle of Skye, on the Sleat peninsula, Isle of Skye
Achnacloich, Ross and Cromarty, a loch (lake) in Ardross, Highland